Social Choice and Welfare is a quarterly peer-reviewed academic journal covering social choice and welfare economics. The journal was established in 1984 and is published by Springer Science+Business Media.

According to the Journal Citation Reports, the journal has a 2013 impact factor of 0.590.

References

External links 
 

English-language journals
Publications established in 1984
Quarterly journals
Social work journals
Springer Science+Business Media academic journals